A Masonic Temple is the conceptual ritualistic space formed when a Masonic Lodge meets, and the physical rooms and structures in which it meets.  It is also used in allegorical terms to describe a philosophical goal (where Masons strive to build a personal Masonic temple of ethics).

Masonic Temple may also refer to specific buildings:

In Australia
Masonic Memorial Temple (Brisbane)

In Canada:
Masonic Temple (St. John's, Newfoundland and Labrador)
Masonic Temple (Toronto)
Masonic Temple (Victoria, British Columbia)
Masonic Temple (Windsor, Ontario)

In Pakistan: 
Masonic Temple (Lahore)

In Spain: 
Masonic Temple of Santa Cruz de Tenerife, Canary Islands

In the United States:
Masonic Temple (Fairbanks, Alaska)
Masonic Temple (El Dorado, Arkansas)
Masonic Temple (Pine Bluff, Arkansas)
Masonic Temple (Kingman, Arizona)
Masonic Temple (Yuma, Arizona)
Masonic Temple and Lodge (Alameda, California)
Masonic Temple (Berkeley, California)
Masonic Temple (Ferndale, California)
Masonic Temple (Fullerton, California) 
Masonic Temple (Long Beach, California)
Masonic Temple (Riverside, California)
Masonic Temple Building (Denver, Colorado)
Masonic Temple (New Britain, Connecticut)
Masonic Temple (Washington, D.C.)
Masonic Temple (Gainesville, Florida)
Masonic Temple (Jacksonville, Florida)
Masonic Temple No. 25, Tampa, Florida
Masonic Temple (Atlanta)
Masonic Temple (Aurora, Illinois)
Masonic Temple (Chicago, Illinois), a skyscraper
Masonic Temple Building (Maywood, Illinois)
Masonic Temple Building (Oak Park, Illinois)
Masonic Temple (Evansville, Indiana)
Masonic Temple (Fort Wayne, Indiana)
Masonic Temple (Franklin, Indiana)
Masonic Temple (Muncie, Indiana)
Masonic Temple (Ames, Iowa)
Masonic Temple of Des Moines, Iowa
Masonic Temple Theater, Mount Pleasant, Iowa
Masonic Temple Building (Stuart, Iowa)
Masonic Temple (Salina, Kansas)
Masonic Temple (Paducah, Kentucky)
Masonic Temple (Shreveport, Louisiana)
Masonic Temple (Belfast, Maine)
Masonic Temple (Portland, Maine)
Masonic Temple (Quincy, Massachusetts)
Masonic Temple (Springfield, Massachusetts)
Masonic Temple (Worcester, Massachusetts)
Masonic Temple (Coldwater, Michigan), listed as a Michigan State Historic Site in Branch County
Detroit Masonic Temple, Detroit, Michigan
Masonic Temple Building (Cadillac, Michigan)
Masonic Temple Building (East Lansing, Michigan)
Masonic Temple Building (Kalamazoo, Michigan)
Masonic Temple Building (Lansing, Michigan)
Masonic Temple Building (Marshall, Michigan)
Masonic Temple (Port Hope, Michigan)
Old Masonic Temple (Marshall, Minnesota)
Hennepin Center for the Arts, Minneapolis, Minnesota, formerly known as Masonic Temple
Masonic Temple (Hattiesburg, Mississippi)
Masonic Temple (Meridian, Mississippi)
Masonic Temple (Kirksville, Missouri)
Masonic Temple (Warrensburg, Missouri)
Mount Zion Lodge Masonic Temple, West Plains, Missouri
Masonic Temple (Billings, Montana)
Masonic Temple (Great Falls, Montana)
Masonic Temple (Lewistown, Montana)
Masonic Temple (Lincoln, Nebraska)
Masonic Temple and Theater, New Bern, North Carolina
Masonic Temple Building (Blount Street, Raleigh, North Carolina)
Masonic Temple Building (Fayetteville Street, Raleigh, North Carolina)
Masonic Temple Building (Shelby, North Carolina)
Masonic Temple (Grand Forks, North Dakota)
Masonic Temple (Columbus, Ohio)
Masonic Temple (Kent, Ohio)
Masonic Temple (Mechanicsburg, Ohio)
Masonic Temple (Sandusky, Ohio)
Masonic Temple (Springfield, Ohio)
Masonic Temple Building (Vermilion, Ohio)
Masonic Temple (Youngstown, Ohio)
Masonic Temple Building (Zanesville, Ohio)
Masonic Temple (Atoka, Oklahoma)
Masonic Temple (Pendleton, Oregon)
Masonic Temple (Chambersburg, Pennsylvania)
Masonic Temple (Philadelphia, Pennsylvania), also known as Grand Lodge of Pennsylvania
Masonic Temple and Scottish Rite Cathedral, Scranton, Pennsylvania, now known as Scranton Cultural Center
Masonic Temple (Aberdeen, South Dakota)
Masonic Temple (Burlington, Vermont), part of the Head of Church Street Historic District, listed on the NRHP
Masonic Temple (Richmond, Virginia)
Masonic Temple-Hoquiam, Hoquiam, Washington
Masonic Temple (Port Angeles, Washington)
Masonic Temple Building-Temple Theater, Tacoma, Washington
Masonic Temple (Yakima, Washington)
Masonic Temple (Fairmont, West Virginia)
Masonic Temple-Watts, Ritter, Wholesale Drygoods Company Building, Huntington, West Virginia
Masonic Temple (Parkersburg, West Virginia)
Masonic Temple (Appleton, Wisconsin), also known as The History Museum at the Castle
Masonic Temple Building (Viroqua, Wisconsin)
Masonic Temple (Casper, Wyoming)
Masonic Temple (Cheyenne, Wyoming)
Masonic Temple (Rock Springs, Wyoming)
Masonic Temple (Huntington, West Virginia)

See also
List of Masonic buildings
Masonic Temple (Grand Canyon)
Mason Temple
Masonic Lodge (disambiguation)
Masonic Building (disambiguation)